Yehoshua is a masculine given name related to Joshua. People named Yehoshua include:

 Gerónimo de Santa Fe (fl. 1550–1620), Spanish physician and religious writer born Yehosúa ben Yosef
 Yehoshua Cohen (1922-1986), assassin of Swedish Count Folke Bernadotte
 Yehoshua Leib Diskin (1818–1898), Lithuanian rabbi, Talmudist and Biblical commentator
 Yehoshua Rokeach (1825–1894), second Rebbe of the Belz Hasidic dynasty, born in the Austrian Empire
 Yehoshua Rozin (1918–2002), Egyptian-born Israeli basketball coach
Yehoshua Schwartz (born 1954), Israeli basketball player
 Yehoshua Sobol (born 1939), Israeli playwright, writer, and director
 Yehoshua Zettler (1917–2009), Jerusalem commander of the Jewish paramilitary group Lehi (Stern gang), planned and carried out the assassination of Swedish Count Folke Bernadotte

Masculine given names
Jewish masculine given names
Hebrew masculine given names
Theophoric names